Mariam Dabboussy is an Australian woman who lived in Daesh controlled Syria.

Dabboussy told The New York Times that she never planned to enter Daesh territory.  She said she travelled to Turkey, with her husband, on what he said was an expedition to help relatives of his escape Syria.  But she claimed she was the victim of a trick, and that, once they were within walking distance of the border he pulled a gun and forced her into Syria, at gunpoint.

The Australian television series Four Corners devoted an episode to Dabboussy.  Dabboussy raised her veil during her television interview, an act she said could trigger retaliation from the most devout occupants of the al-Hawl refugee camp.  She told reporters that her brother in law, Mohammed, convinced or coerced at least a dozen Australians into Daesh territory. Reporters who compared those images with her wedding photos, described her face as "wizened".

Her father's efforts to convince the Australian government to repatriate her have received worldwide attention.  He assured the Australian public that his granddaughter, and the other Australian refugees, had all agreed to be subject to a control order, when they were repatriated.  Her father told Radio New Zealand that Australian security officials were well aware she had been duped into entering Daesh territory, as he wasn't aware she was in Daesh territory, and they told him she had been duped.

Dabboussy married in 2011, and lived with her husband's family after she became pregnant in 2014.  She attributed her husband Khaled's ploy to trick her into Syria to his elder brother Mohammed.  She had given birth to her first child, prior to her arrival in Syria, and was pregnant with a second child.  Her husband was killed within three months of her arrival, and prior to the birth of her second child.  By 2019 she had given birth to a third child.

References

Australian expatriates in Syria
1992 births
Living people